Neerja Bhanot (7 September 1963 – 5 September 1986) was an Indian purser who died while saving passengers on Pan Am Flight 73 which had been hijacked by terrorists from a terrorist organization during a stopover in Karachi, Pakistan, on 5 September 1986, just two days before her 23rd birthday. Posthumously, she became and remains the youngest recipient of India's highest peacetime gallantry award, the Ashoka Chakra, as well as several other accolades from the governments of Pakistan and the United States. She was shot while trying to save 3 children from the plane . Her life and heroism inspired the 2016 biopic Neerja directed by Ram Madhvani and starring Indian actress Sonam Kapoor.

Early life and family
Bhanot was born in Chandigarh, India, and brought up in Bombay, Maharashtra (present-day Mumbai) into a Punjabi Hindu Brahmin family of the Bhanot clan. She was the daughter of Harish Bhanot, a Bombay-based journalist, and Rama Bhanot. She had two brothers, Akhil and Aneesh Bhanot. She received her early schooling at Sacred Heart Senior Secondary School in Chandigarh. When the family moved to Bombay, she continued her studies at Bombay Scottish School and then graduated from St. Xavier's College, Bombay. It was in Bombay where she was first spotted for a modeling assignment which began her modeling career. She was a huge fan of actor Rajesh Khanna and used to refer to quotes from his films throughout her life.

Her father, Harish Bhanot, worked as a journalist with The Hindustan Times for more than 30 years and died on New Year's Day in 2008 in Chandigarh at the age of 86. Her mother died on 5 December 2015 at the age of 86.

Career
Bhanot applied for a flight attendant job with Pan Am, when in 1985 it decided to have an all Indian cabin crew for its Frankfurt to India routes. Upon selection, she went to Miami, Florida for training as a flight attendant, but returned as a purser. She also had a successful modelling career simultaneously during her work at Pan Am.

Hijacking 
Bhanot was the Senior Flight Purser on Pan Am Flight 73 flying from Bombay to the United States via Karachi and Frankfurt, which was hijacked by four armed men on 5 September 1986. The aircraft was carrying 380 passengers and 13 crew members. The terrorists wanted to fly to Cyprus with the goal of freeing Palestinian prisoners in Cyprus. Bhanot was able to alert the cockpit crew as soon as the hijackers boarded the plane, and as the plane was on the apron, the three-member cockpit crew of pilot, co-pilot and the flight engineer fled from the aircraft through an overhead hatch in the cockpit. As the most senior cabin crew member, Bhanot took charge of the situation inside the plane.

The hijackers were part of the Abu Nidal Organization, a Palestinian terrorist organization backed by Libya; they were targeting Americans and American assets. In the early minutes of the hijacking, they identified an Indian-American citizen, dragged him to the exit, shot him dead and threw his body from the plane. The terrorists then instructed Bhanot to collect the passports of all the passengers so that they could identify the other Americans on board. She and the other attendants under her charge hid the passports of the remaining 43 Americans on board, some under a seat and the rest down a garbage chute so that the hijackers could not differentiate between American and non-American passengers.

After 17 hours, the hijackers opened fire and set off explosives. Bhanot opened one of the airplane doors, and even though she could have been the first one to jump out and flee from the aircraft, she did not do so and instead started helping the other passengers escape. According to a surviving passenger, "She was guiding the passengers to the emergency exit. That is when the terrorists were firing constantly fearing a commando attack. They saw Neerja relentlessly trying to help three unaccompanied children, among others, out and that is when they caught her by her hair and shot her point blank." A child on board, then aged seven, became a captain for a major airline and has stated that Bhanot has been his inspiration, and that he owes every day of his life to her. She was recognized internationally as "the heroine of the hijacking" and became the youngest recipient of the Ashok Chakra Award, India's most prestigious gallantry award for bravery during peacetime.

In addition to saving the lives of many hostages, Bhanot had also helped prevent the plane from getting off the ground. She posthumously received multiple awards for her courage from the Government of United States, and the Tamgha-e-Pakistan from Pakistan, an award given for showing great human kindness.

Legacy
For her bravery, the Government of India posthumously awarded Bhanot the Ashoka Chakra Award, India's highest gallantry award for bravery in the face of the enemy during peacetime. She is the youngest recipient to date and the first female recipient of this award. In 2004 the Indian Postal Service released a stamp commemorating her.
After her death, her family set up the Neerja Bhanot Trust from the insurance proceeds. The trust presents two awards every year, one for a flight crew member, worldwide, who acts beyond the call of duty and another, the Neerja Bhanot Award, to an Indian woman who when faced with social injustice, bravely faced the situation and helped other women in similar social distress. The award includes a sum of INR 150,000 (approximately US$2,000) a trophy and a citation.

Bhanot's brother Aneesh went to Washington, D.C., in 2005 to receive the "Justice for Crimes Award" awarded posthumously to her as part of the Annual Crime Rights Week at a ceremony held at the United States Attorney's office for the District of Columbia. In 2006, she and the other Pan Am Flight 73 flight attendants and Pan Am's flight director for Pakistan were awarded the Special Courage award by the United States Department of Justice.

Bhanot House of Austrey School was named in her honour.

The Civil Aviation Ministry of India conferred an honor on Bhanot posthumously on 18 February 2010 in New Delhi on the occasion of the launch of the celebrations of the centenary of Indian aviation.

On 2 July 2016, the Bharat Gaurav Award was conferred on her at a ceremony held at the House of Commons, UK Parliament in London, England.

On 30 May 2018, Panjab University inaugurated the Neerja Bhanot Hostel (dormitory) on the university campus in Chandigarh. The hostel provides living accommodations over 350 female students.

In popular culture
 The Neerja I Knew – a coffee table book conceptualised by her brother Aneesh Bhanot and published as a tribute to Bhanot, consisting of several chapters written by people who knew her.

 Neerja – a 2016 Indian Hindi-language biographical thriller drama film written by Saiwyn Quadras and directed by Ram Madhvani starring Sonam Kapoor in title role of "Head Purser" Neerja Bhanot. Sonam Kapoor received a special mention National Award for her acting in the film in 2017. 
The Smile of Courage – a book written by her brother Aneesh Bhanot.

Awards and honours
 Ashoka Chakra, 1987, India
 Tamgha-e- Pakistan, 1987, (for showing incredible human kindness), Pakistan
 Flight Safety Foundation Heroism Award 1987, United States
 Justice for Crimes Award 2005, United States Attorney's Office for the District of Columbia, United States
 Special Courage Award 2006, United States Department of Justice, United States
 Civil Aviation Ministry Award 2011, India
 Bharat Gaurav Award presented at the House of Commons, UK Parliament on 2 July 2016

See also 
Frankie Housley
Barbara Jane Harrison

References

External links
 – account of the trial of Zaid Hassan Abd Latif Safarini
Survivor describes Pan Am 73
Facts about Pam Am 73
The full story of Neeja Bhanot
Neerja Bhanot. The Smile of Courage.

1963 births
1986 deaths
Deaths by firearm in Sindh
Flight attendants
Terrorism victims in India
Mass murder victims
1986 murders in Pakistan
Pan Am people
Punjabi people
Punjabi Hindus
Punjabi Brahmins
Female models from Chandigarh
St. Xavier's College, Mumbai alumni
Terrorism deaths in Pakistan
Female models from Mumbai
Women from Maharashtra
20th-century Indian women
20th-century Indian people
Recipients of the Ashoka Chakra (military decoration)
Ashoka Chakra
Indian people murdered abroad